Lawrence Harman Parsons, 1st Earl of Rosse (26 July 1749 – 20 April 1807), known as The Lord Oxmantown between 1792 and 1795 and as The Viscount Oxmantown between 1795 and 1806, was an Irish peer and politician.

Background
Rosse was the second son of Sir Laurence Parsons, 3rd Baronet, of Birr Castle, County Offaly, by his wife Anne, daughter of Wentworth Harman. He inherited the County Longford estates of his uncle the Rev. Cutts Harman, with the proviso that he would adopt the Harman surname (thus becoming Laurence Harman Harman).

Political career
He was a Member of the Irish House of Commons for Longford County from 1775 to 1792 and for County Longford from 1790 to 1792. In 1792 he was raised to the Peerage of Ireland as Baron of Oxmantown, in the County of Dublin, with remainder to his nephew Sir Lawrence Parsons, 5th Baronet. In 1795 he was made Viscount Oxmantown, of Oxmantown in the County of Dublin, also in the Peerage of Ireland but with normal remainder to the heirs male of his body. Lord Oxmantown was even further honoured in 1806 when he was created Earl of Rosse in the Irish peerage, with similar remainder as for the barony. From 1800 to 1807 he sat in the House of Lords sat as one of the 28 original Irish Representative Peers.

Family
Lord Rosse married Lady Jane, daughter of Edward King, 1st Earl of Kingston and Jane Caulfield, in 1772. He died in April 1807, aged 57, when the viscountcy became extinct; he was succeeded in the barony and earldom according to the special remainder by his nephew, Lawrence. Lady Rosse died in January 1838 and the estates were inherited by their only child, Lady Frances (1775 - 1841), wife of Robert King, 1st Viscount Lorton, whose descendants were the King-Harman family of Newcastle House, County Longford.

References

|-

1749 births
1807 deaths
Peers of Ireland created by George III
Irish MPs 1769–1776
Irish MPs 1776–1783
Irish MPs 1783–1790
Irish MPs 1790–1797
Members of the Irish House of Lords
Irish representative peers
Members of the Parliament of Ireland (pre-1801) for County Longford constituencies
Parsons, Laurence
Earls of Rosse (1806 creation)